Andreas Martin may refer to:

Andreas Martin (lutenist) (born 1963), from Germany
Andreas Martin (painter) (1699–1763), Flemish painter and draughtsman
Andreas Martin (singer) (born 1952), schlager singer from Germany